Dave Shondell (born January 17, 1958) is the head women's volleyball coach at Purdue University.

Shondell was raised in Muncie, Indiana.  He began his career at Daleville High School in Daleville, Indiana, just outside Muncie.  After his tenure there, he then moved to Muncie Central High School, in Muncie.  While at Muncie Central and Daleville, he earned about 600 wins with roughly a .850 winning percentage, 4 state championships, and a mythical national runner-up.  He was also recognized as the 2002 National Coach of the Year by Prepvolleyball.com. He took over as director the Munciana Volleyball Club while at Muncie Central.  Munciana earned almost 20 national championships under Shondell's direction. It is still known as one of the premier volleyball clubs in the country.  In 2003, he accepted the Women's Volleyball coaching job at Purdue University. In his seventeen years at Purdue, Shondell has accumulated over 370 victories, fourteen NCAA Tournament berths, eight trips to the Sweet Sixteen, and two trips to the Elite Eight.

Head coaching record
Throughout his career at Purdue University, Shondell has gradually enhanced the program's Big Ten standings.

Sources:

Family 
Shondell is part of possibly, the most well-known family in volleyball.

Shondell is the son of Dr. Don Shondell.  Shondell's brother is Steve Shondell, former head women's volleyball coach at Ball State University.  Shondell's other brother, John, is one of his assistants at Purdue.  Shondell's youngest child Kyle is the head coach at Indiana Tech.

References 

Living people
1958 births
American volleyball coaches
Volleyball coaches from Indiana
Sportspeople from Muncie, Indiana
Purdue Boilermakers women's volleyball coaches
Ball State Cardinals men's volleyball coaches